Amaurobius strandi is a species of spider in the family Amaurobiidae, found in Greece, Bulgaria and Ukraine. It was first described in 1937 by Dmitry Kharitonov, as A. pallidus strandi, and elevated to a full species by Kovblyuk in 2002.

References

strandi
Spiders of Europe
Spiders described in 1937
Taxa named by Dmitry Kharitonov